Gregory Frederick Van Tatenhove, also known as Greg Van Tatenhove, (born April 2, 1960) is a US district judge of the US  District Court for the Eastern District of Kentucky. He was a legislative aide of Senator Mitch McConnell, a law clerk for Judge Eugene E. Siler, Jr., US Attorney for the Eastern District of Kentucky (2001-05), and on the recommendation of Senators Jim Bunning and Mitch McConnell he was nominated to fill his current seat on the US  District Court for the Eastern District of Kentucky (2006-present). Daniel Cameron was a law clerk for Van Tatenhove, who later swore him in as Kentucky Attorney General.

Education and career

Van Tatenhove was born in Los Angeles, California. He attended high school in Jessamine County, Kentucky, and received a BA from Asbury College (now Asbury University) in 1982. He was then a legislative Senate aide of Mitch McConnell.

He attended the University of Kentucky College of Law where he obtained a JD in 1989.  He was a law clerk for Judge Eugene E. Siler, Jr. of the US District Court for the Eastern District of Kentucky, from 1989 to 1990. Van Tatenhove served as a trial attorney for the US Department of Justice, Federal Programs Branch, from 1990 to 1994. From 1994 to 2001, he was Chief of Staff & legal counsel for right-wing Congressman Ron Lewis. In 2001, George W. Bush appointed him US Attorney for the Eastern District of Kentucky, a post he held from 2001 to 2005.

Federal judicial service

On September 13, 2005, on the recommendation of Senators Jim Bunning and Mitch McConnell, President George W. Bush nominated Van Tatenhove to fill a seat on the US  District Court for the Eastern District of Kentucky previously held by Karl Spillman Forester. Van Tatenhove was confirmed by the US Senate on December 21, 2005, and received his commission on January 5, 2006.

Kentucky Attorney General Daniel Cameron was a law clerk for Van Tatenhove for two years, in 2011-13. Upon Cameron's election to Kentucky Attorney General, Van Tatenhove swore him into office.

Notable cases
On October 11, 2014, Van Tatenhove held that Kentucky Educational Television did not have to allow a Libertarian candidate to be part of a debate with Mitch McConnell and Alison Lundergan Grimes, the candidate’s opponents in a battle to be elected US Senator. The chair of the Kentucky Libertarian Party said he was disgusted with the judge's ruling, given that the tv station had changed its standards for inclusion in the debate mid-stream.

On January 25, 2016, Van Tatenhove ruled in favor of the Christian apologetics, anti-evolution organization, Answers in Genesis, in the case of Ark Encounter vs. Bob Stewart, ordering the state to process the application for the tax rebate incentives for the Ark Encounter theme park that would become available once the attraction opened.

On March 30, 2018, he ruled that Governor Bevin did not violate the 1st amendment when he blocked viewers from his Facebook and Twitter accounts due to their political beliefs. His ruling contradicted a similar ruling that stated that then-president Donald Trump had violated the 1st amendment when blocking individuals from his Twitter account due to their political beliefs.

On May 8, 2020, Van Tatenhove, in a later-overturned opinion, ruled that Kentucky churches could hold in-person services during the COVID-19 pandemic in Kentucky starting May 10. In his ruling, he said that in-person meeting was essential for the church, writing "The orders at issue do not simply restrict religious expression; they restrict religious expression in an attempt to protect the public health during a global pandemic." However, a unanimous three-judge panel of the United States Court of Appeals for the Sixth Circuit stayed Van Tatenhove’s ruling, and overturned his injunction while an appeal moved forward. Senator Mitch McConnell and 37 other senators filed a brief supporting Van Tatenhove's opinion. In December 2020, the US Supreme Court overturned Van Tatenhove's ruling.

Personal
In November 2020, Van Tatenhove's wife Christy Trout Van Tatenhove donated $250,000 to the McConnell Center, created by Senator Mitch McConnell.

References

Sources

1960 births
Living people
Asbury University alumni
Judges of the United States District Court for the Eastern District of Kentucky
People from Los Angeles
University of Kentucky College of Law alumni
United States district court judges appointed by George W. Bush
21st-century American judges
United States Attorneys for the Eastern District of Kentucky